Hydromyza is a genus of dung flies in the family Scathophagidae. There are at least three described species in Hydromyza.

Species
These three species belong to the genus Hydromyza:
 Hydromyza confluens Loew, 1863
 Hydromyza glabra (Walker, 1849)
 Hydromyza livens (Fabricius, 1794)

References

Further reading

External links

 

Scathophagidae
Articles created by Qbugbot
Schizophora genera